Olivier Martinez (born 12 January 1966)
is a French actor. He became well known after roles in several French films such as Un, deux, trois, soleil (1993), which garnered him the César Award for "Most Promising Actor", The Horseman on the Roof (1995),  and The Chambermaid on the Titanic (1997). He has also appeared in Hollywood-produced features, including the drama Before Night Falls (2000), the erotic thriller Unfaithful (2002) and playing the role of a French drug lord in the action-crime-thriller S.W.A.T. (2003).

Early life
Martinez was born in Paris, France, to a working-class family. His father was a Spanish professional boxer and his mother was a French secretary. He studied at the CNSAD and began his acting career in his native France in 1990. Martinez was raised Catholic.

Career
In 1994, Martinez won a César Award as "Most Promising Actor" for his role in the film Un, deux, trois, soleil (1993). This was followed by a leading role in the Jean-Paul Rappeneau period film The Horseman on the Roof (Le Hussard sur le Toit) in 1995 in which he starred alongside Juliette Binoche as an Italian nobleman. The film was hailed as the most expensive French film at that time in history but failed to reach its $35 million budget. In 1996/7 he appeared in  Bertrand Blier's romantic comedy My Man (Mon Homme) alongside Anouk Grinberg, Gérard Lanvin, and Valeria Bruni Tedeschi. Later in 1997 he played a leading role in Bigas Luna's drama The Chambermaid on the Titanic (La Femme de chambre du Titanic) alongside Romane Bohringer, set during the time of the Titanics sinking voyage in 1912. Martinez portrays a French foundry worker who wins a strongman contest and the prize of a trip to view the departing maiden voyage of the ill-fated Titanic. The film was well-received; Mick LaSalle of the San Francisco Chronicle praised what he felt was a rare honest portrayal of male sexuality by Martinez.

Martinez first came to mainstream attention in Hollywood films with his performance in Julian Schnabel's Before Night Falls (2000) opposite Javier Bardem and Johnny Depp. The screenplay is based on the autobiography of the same name of Reinaldo Arenas, which was published in English in 1993. The film was highly critically acclaimed, although Martinez's performance was overshadowed by that of Bardem in the eyes of critics. He was later noted for his performance opposite Diane Lane in Unfaithful (2002). He has since appeared in a television adaptation of The Roman Spring of Mrs. Stone (2003), S.W.A.T. (2003) and Taking Lives (2004). He also starred as Gabriel in the 2007 movie adaptation of Blood and Chocolate, a popular book. Martinez plays Mauritius, prefect of Mamertine Prison in Paul, Apostle of Christ (2017).

Personal life
Martinez began a relationship with Australian singer and actress Kylie Minogue after meeting her at the 2003 Grammy Awards ceremony. They ended their relationship in February 2007.

Martinez began dating American actress Halle Berry in 2010 after meeting on the set of the action thriller film Dark Tide (2012). They confirmed their engagement in March 2012. On 22 November 2012, Martinez was treated at a Los Angeles hospital after being injured in a physical altercation with Canadian model Gabriel Aubry, Berry's former partner and father of her daughter. Aubry and Berry had been involved in a custody battle centered on Berry's desire to move with their daughter and Martinez to his native France, a request denied by a judge less than two weeks prior to the altercation, on the grounds that it would interfere with Berry and Aubry's joint custody arrangement. The custody dispute was resolved at the end of November.

Berry and Martinez married in a private ceremony in France on 13 July 2013. Their son was born in October 2013 in Los Angeles. They announced their divorce in 2015, and it was reported to have been finalized in December 2016. However, as of November 2020, the case is ongoing.

Apart from his native French, he is also fluent in Spanish, due to his Valencian and Andalusian heritage, and English.

Filmography

Film

Television

Awards

References

External links
 
 "Olivier!", Cinetropic.com

1966 births
Living people
Most Promising Actor César Award winners
French male film actors
French Roman Catholics
Male actors from Paris
French people of Spanish descent
French National Academy of Dramatic Arts alumni